Jurgen Dosti (born 2 November 1991) is an Albanian professional footballer who currently plays for KF Elbasani in the Albanian Superliga.

Honours
KF Elbasani
Albanian First Division (1): 2013-14

References

1991 births
Living people
Footballers from Elbasan
Albanian footballers
Association football midfielders
KF Elbasani players
Kategoria Superiore players